The Progressive Conservative Party of Quebec fielded twelve candidates in the 1989 provincial election, none of whom were elected. The party was not affiliated with the Progressive Conservative Party of Canada.

Candidates

Rosemont: Lyse T. Giguère
Lyse T. Giguère received 298 votes (1.07%), finishing fourth against Liberal Party incumbent Guy Rivard.

References

Candidates in Quebec provincial elections
1989